Miloš Bosančić (born 22 May 1988) is a Serbian former professional footballer who played as an attacking midfielder.

Club career
Bosančić came through the youth system of Partizan, signing his first professional contract with the club in December 2005. He made his competitive debut in the 2006–07 season, collecting 26 appearances across all competitions. In June 2007, Bosančić moved to Portuguese club Boavista on a season-long loan. He appeared in only one game and returned to Partizan after just three months. In February 2008, Bosančić was loaned to OFK Beograd until the end of the season.

In September 2008, Bosančić signed a three-year contract with Čukarički. He appeared in 24 league games and scored one goal in the 2008–09 season, helping the club avoid relegation from the top flight. In July 2009, Bosančić moved abroad for the second time and signed with Slovak club Slovan Liberec. He was a regular member of the team that won Czech First League in the 2011–12 season, contributing with six goals in 25 appearances. In early 2013, Bosančić moved to Asia and signed with Gyeongnam.

In July 2014, Bosančić returned to Serbia and signed a three-year deal with Red Star Belgrade. He left the club the following year, before returning to Asia and joining Chinese side Hangzhou Greentown. In 2016, Bosančić played for Thai club BEC-Tero Sasana.

In February 2017, Bosančić rejoined his former club Slovan Liberec after four years. He signed a one-and-a-half-year contract and was given the number 10 shirt. In 2018, Bosančić briefly played for Keşlə, before moving to fellow Azerbaijani club Sabah.

In June 2019, Bosančić returned to his homeland and joined Voždovac. He left the club two months later and switched to fellow Belgrade club Rad.

International career
In August 2004, Bosančić, aged 16, was called up to the Serbia and Montenegro under-21 team for a friendly against Slovenia in Ljubljana. He played the first half in an eventual 3–1 victory. Later on, Bosančić represented Serbia at the 2007 UEFA European Under-19 Championship.

Honours
Slovan Liberec
 Czech First League: 2011–12

References

External links
 
 
 
 
 
 

Association football midfielders
Azerbaijan Premier League players
Boavista F.C. players
Chinese Super League players
Czech First League players
Expatriate footballers in Azerbaijan
Expatriate footballers in China
Expatriate footballers in Portugal
Expatriate footballers in South Korea
Expatriate footballers in the Czech Republic
FC Slovan Liberec players
First League of Serbia and Montenegro players
FK Čukarički players
FK Partizan players
FK Rad players
FK Teleoptik players
FK Voždovac players
Gyeongnam FC players
K League 1 players
Shamakhi FK players
OFK Beograd players
People from Ruma
Milos Bosancic
Primeira Liga players
Red Star Belgrade footballers
Sabah FC (Azerbaijan) players
Serbia and Montenegro footballers
Serbia under-21 international footballers
Serbia youth international footballers
Serbian expatriate footballers
Serbian expatriate sportspeople in Azerbaijan
Serbian expatriate sportspeople in China
Serbian expatriate sportspeople in Portugal
Serbian expatriate sportspeople in South Korea
Serbian expatriate sportspeople in the Czech Republic
Serbian footballers
Serbian SuperLiga players
Milos Bosancic
Zhejiang Professional F.C. players
1988 births
Living people